Bernabé Argüelles de Paz (1912–1943) was an Asturian anarchist.

Biography 
Born in the Asturian town of Pola de Lena in 1912, he was a member of the National Confederation of Labor (CNT). After the outbreak of the Spanish Civil War he joined the anarcho-syndicalist militias. Later he became part of the political commissariat of the Spanish Republican Army, serving as commissar of the 133rd Mixed Brigade. At the end of the war he was detained by the nationalists, being imprisoned in the provincial prison of Huesca.

Thanks to the intervention of the Ponzán group, in mid-1940 he was able to escape from prison together with other imprisoned anarchists. He managed to reach Catalonia, where he developed an intense activity underground. Argüelles was part of the Aragón-Cataluña interregional committee of the CNT. On March 8, 1943, he was arrested by Francoist security forces. Tried by a court-martial, he was sentenced to death and executed by garrote on March 24, 1943, in Barcelona.

Notes

References

Bibliography 
 
 
 
 

1912 births
1943 deaths
People executed by Francoist Spain
Confederación Nacional del Trabajo members
Spanish anarchists
People from Asturias
Spanish military personnel of the Spanish Civil War (Republican faction)
People executed by ligature strangulation
Executed anarchists